Omar Maskati is an American actor known for his roles in Better Call Saul and Unbelievable. He recently starred in the movie Evil Eye and had main roles in the television series Good Sam and As We See It.

Personal life
Maskati's father is from Pune, India and his mother is Puerto Rican and he grew up in Edison, New Jersey. His father is Muslim and his mother is Catholic and he considered himself both Muslim and Catholic in high school. He graduated as salutatorian from Edison High School in 2007. In 2011, he received a degree in engineering from University of Pennsylvania, where he also minored in theater arts. He chose acting as a career after graduation.

Filmography

Film

Television

References

External links
 Personal website

Living people
American male film actors
21st-century American male actors
American male television actors
Edison High School (New Jersey) alumni
American people of Indian descent
American people of Puerto Rican descent
Hispanic and Latino American male actors
American Muslims
American Catholics
University of Pennsylvania School of Engineering and Applied Science alumni
1989 births